The Women's pair event at the 2010 South American Games was held on March 22 at 11:40.

Medalists

Records

Results

References
Final

Pair W